David Paton (born August 16, 1930) is a retired ophthalmologist best known as founder in 1970 of Project Orbis (now named Orbis International, Inc.) and thereafter as its first Medical Director helping to develop (1970–1982) and then deploy its teaching aircraft for ophthalmologists worldwide, especially in the developing nations. Paton resigned from Orbis in 1987 and focused on other aspects of academic ophthalmology, but in 2011 he returned in a voluntary capacity to assist in fund raising for a new annual appointment, the David Paton Orbis Fellowship in Global Ophthalmology.

Biography 
Paton was born in Baltimore, Maryland, in August 1930. He is the son of a prominent ophthalmologist, Richard Townley Paton, founder in 1946 of the world's first eye bank. His paternal grandfather, Stewart Paton MD was a neurologist and psychiatrist, and his maternal grandfather, Frederic Hill Meserve was a self-made businessman, and the first great collector of photographs of Abraham Lincoln, Civil War leaders, and other notable persons of the nineteenth century.

Paton is a graduate of Princeton University and The Johns Hopkins School of Medicine where he later served as a member of the faculty of the Wilmer Eye Institute. He is past Chairman of The American Board of Ophthalmology, past First Vice-President of The American Academy of Ophthalmology, and former Chairman of the Department of Ophthalmology at Baylor College of Medicine.

In 2011, one year after his granddaughter Cricket Paton was born, Paton self-published his memoir, Second Sight: Views from An Eye Doctor's Odyssey.

Education and work 

 1937–43 – The Buckley School, NY, George Lane Nichols Award
 1943–48 – The Hill School, PA, School President ‘48
 1948–52 – Princeton University, B.A., Senior Class, Vice President
 1952–56 – Johns Hopkins School of Medicine, M.D.
 1956–57 – Cornell University Medical College, NY, Internship
 1957–59 – National Institutes of Health, MD, NINDB, Public Health Service
 1959–64 – Johns Hopkins Hospital, Wilmer Eye Institute, Residency
 1964–71 – Johns Hopkins Hospital, Wilmer Eye Institute, Faculty
 1971–82 – Baylor College of Medicine, Houston, TX, Cullen Eye Institute, Chairman & Director
 1982–84 – King Khaled Eye Specialist Hospital (KKESH), Riyadh, Saudi Arabia, Medical Director
 1984–86 – OcuSystems, Inc., CT, Founder, Medical Director
 1986–93 – Weill Cornell Medical College, NY, Professor, Catholic Medical Center of Brooklyn & Queens, Department of Ophthalmology, Chairman
 1998– – Baylor College of Medicine, Houston, TX, Emeritus Professor

Awards and honors

Achievements 
 Markle Scholar, Academic Medicine, 1967–72
 American College of Surgeons, Fellow, 1965–
 Johns Hopkins School of Medicine, Dean, Student Admissions, 1967–70
 American Board of Ophthalmology, Chairman 1981-81
 American Academy of Ophthalmology, Secretary, Continuing Education, 1977–82
 American Academy of Ophthalmology, First Vice President, 1982
 Project ORBIS, Founder, Medical Director, 1968–87
 As teacher, surgeon and/or medical administrator: a cumulative four years in developing countries.
 Honorary member or honored guest of ten South American medical societies
 Over time, numerous international and domestic board memberships of domestic and international NGOs

DSc honorary degrees 
 Bridgeport University, 1984
 Princeton University, 1985

Other honors 
 Legion of Honor, France, Chevalier, 1988
 Presidential Citizens Medal, US, 1987
 Princeton Class of ’52, Distinguished Classmate Award, 1992
 Johns Hopkins University School of Medicine, Distinguished Medical Alumnus Award, 2005

References

External links 
 Second Sight: Views from an Eye Doctor's Odyssey

American ophthalmologists
1930 births
Living people
The Hill School alumni
Buckley School (New York City) alumni
Princeton University alumni
Johns Hopkins School of Medicine alumni
Baylor College of Medicine faculty
Cornell University faculty